Serge Poignant (born November 1, 1947 in Segré) is a member of the National Assembly of France.  He represents the Loire-Atlantique department,  and is a member of the Union for a Popular Movement.

References

1947 births
Living people
People from Maine-et-Loire
Politicians from Pays de la Loire
Rally for the Republic politicians
Union for a Popular Movement politicians
Deputies of the 10th National Assembly of the French Fifth Republic
Deputies of the 11th National Assembly of the French Fifth Republic
Deputies of the 12th National Assembly of the French Fifth Republic
Deputies of the 13th National Assembly of the French Fifth Republic